The COVID-19 pandemic was confirmed to have reached the Spanish territory of Ceuta in March 2020.


Timeline

March 2020
A man from the Iberian Peninsula arrived in Ceuta on March 10 with symptoms of the novel coronavirus, and was taken to the hospital to remain under observation for five days. After testing him on 13 March, the man tested positive for COVID-19.

April 2020
By April 4, the territory had confirmed 83 cases of COVID-19, with 74 staying at home (two of which had thus far recovered), seven cases hospitalized, and two deaths.

As of April 16, the city confirmed 100 cases of COVID-19 total. 42 people had overcome the virus, and four had died.

References

21st century in Ceuta
2020 in Spain
2021 in Spain
Ceuta
Ceuta
Disease outbreaks in Ceuta